Eduardo Arroyo (born 11 May 1932) is a Bolivian former sports shooter. He competed in the 50 metre rifle, prone event at the 1972 Summer Olympics.

References

External links
 

1932 births
Living people
Bolivian male sport shooters
Olympic shooters of Bolivia
Shooters at the 1972 Summer Olympics
Place of birth missing (living people)